The Hazratbal Shrine, popularly called Dargah Sharif ("the Holy Shrine"), is a Muslim shrine located in Hazratbal locality of Srinagar in Jammu and Kashmir, India. It contains a relic, Moi-e-Muqqadas, which is widely believed to be the hair of the Islamic prophet Muhammad. It is situated on the northern bank of the Dal Lake in Srinagar, and is considered to be Kashmir's holiest Muslim shrine.

The name of the shrine is a combination of the Arabic word hazrat and the Kashmiri word bal.

History and present status

Hazratbal Shrine was initially established by Inayat Begum, the daughter of Khwaja Nur-ud-Din Eshai and the custodian of the holy relic. The first building of the shrine was constructed in 17th century by Mughal subedar Sadiq Khan during the emperor Shah Jahan's reign. This was initially called Ishrat Jahan. The building was ordered to be converted into a prayer hall in 1634 by Shah Jahan. Construction of the present day structure was started in 1968 and took 11 years to complete, finishing in 1979.

The shrine contains strands of what is believed by many Muslims to be the hair of the Islamic prophet Muhammad. The relic was first brought to Kashmir by Syed Abdullah Madani, a purported descendant of Muhammad who left Medina (in present-day Saudi Arabia) and settled in the South Indian city of Bijapur in 1635, at a time when the Islamic Mughal Empire was rapidly expanding across India.

Following Abdullah's death, his son Syed Hameed inherited the relic. The region was conquered by the Mughals shortly afterwards, and Hameed was stripped of his family estates. Finding himself unable to care for the relic, he passed it to Khwaja Nur-ud-Din Eshai, a wealthy Kashmiri businessman.

However, when the Mughal emperor Aurangzeb was informed of the holy relic's existence and transfer, he had it seized and sent to the shrine of Sufi mystic Mu'in al-Din Chishti in Ajmer, and imprisoned Eshai in Delhi. After nine days Aurangzeb had a dream of Muhammad with four caliphs: Abu Bakr, Umar, Usman and Ali. In the dream, Muhammad ordered him to send the Moi-e-Muqaddas to Kashmir from Ajmer. Then Aurangzeb returned the holy relic to Eshai and allow him to take it to Kashmir. However, Eshai had already died while imprisoned. By 1700, the relic had been transported to Kashmir, along with the body of Eshai. There, Inayat Begum, the daughter of Eshai, became the custodian of the relic and established the Hazratbal Shrine. Since then, her male descendants have been caretakers of the relic at the mosque. 
Begum's male descendants belong to what is known as the Banday family. , three main members care for the holy relic: Manzoor Ahmad Banday, Ishaq Banday and Mohiuddin Banday. The relic is displayed for public view only on special Islamic occasions, such as the birthdays of Muhammad and his four main companions.

The caretakers of the shrine are known as nishandeh. The eldest male heirs of the previous nishandeh continue the legacy of displaying the relic when their predecessor dies.

1963 relic disappearance episode

The Moi-e-Muqqadas, a relic widely believed by Muslims to be the hair of Muhammad, was reported to have gone missing from the shrine on 27 December 1963. Following its disappearance, mass demonstrations were held all over the state, with hundreds of thousands of protesters out in the streets. On 31 December, Indian Prime Minister Jawaharlal Nehru made a broadcast to the nation on the disappearance of the sacred Muslim relic, and sent a team from the Central Bureau of Investigation into Jammu and Kashmir to probe the suspected theft. The relic was recovered by Indian authorities on 4 January 1964, at the instigation of Sayyid Meerak Shah Kashani and others. Shah Kashani said he had seen the relic many times and could easily identify it. Identification by its caretakers and other investigation made by the Government of Jammu and Kashmir (law and order), special identification team says its authenticity is indeed original.

Sayyid Meerak recited a poem: 
The Garden is bright with the light of Muhammad
The light of Muhammad is reflected in every flower and every plant.

A public viewing of the relic was held on 6 February 1964 in remembrance of Ali bin Abu Talib.

The incident led to communal tensions and riots in the Indian state of West Bengal and East Pakistan (now Bangladesh), due to which India saw a refugee influx of around 200,000 people between December 1963 and February 1964.

Demands were made that it be officially identified by the elders. It was charged that political bosses had stolen the hair so they could later come to power by taking credit for restoring it.

See also

 Ziyarat Naqshband Sahab
 Hamza Makhdoom
 Khanqah-e-Moula
 Dastgeer Sahib

References 

Sufi shrines in India
Buildings and structures in Srinagar
Mosques in Jammu and Kashmir